Laura Post (born June 23) is an American voice actress and voice director known for her works in anime dubbed in English by Bang Zoom! Entertainment and Studiopolis like portraying Aria Lieze in Magical Girl Lyrical Nanoha A's, Ragyo Kiryuin in Kill la Kill, Rosalia in Sword Art Online, Eri Watabe in Lagrange: The Flower of Rin-ne, Blizzard in One Punch Man, Bosbos in Redline, and Witch Regret in Edens Zero. She also has portrayed characters in video games like Ahri in League of Legends, Queen Azshara in World of Warcraft: Cataclysm, Haruka Sakaki in Godzilla: The Planet Eater, Valentine in Skullgirls, Harley Quinn in Batman: The Enemy Within, and Arfoire in Hyperdimension Neptunia.

Biography
Post graduated from Columbia College Chicago in 2007. She was also taught by various voice actors like   Steve Staley, Tony Oliver, Huck Ligget, Bob Bergen, Bill Holmes, and Richard Horvitz. Post started out by providing voices in audio dramas, as well as for commercials, documentaries, and industrial work.

Filmography

Anime

Animation

Films

Video games

References

External links

 
 
 
 
Interview with Laura Post on the Mentally Obsessed Podcast

American video game actresses
American voice actresses
Living people
21st-century American actresses
Actresses from Pasadena, California
Columbia College Chicago alumni
People from Pasadena, California
1983 births